Minge is a surname. Notable people with the surname include:

David Minge (born 1942), American politician
Ewa Minge (born 1967), Polish fashion designer
Ralf Minge (born 1960), German football player and coach
Janina Minge (born 1999), German football player
Siri Minge (born 1994), Norwegian cyclist

See also
Minges